"Lion-Eating Poet in the Stone Den" is a short narrative poem written in Classical Chinese that is composed of about 94 characters (depending on the specific version) in which every word is pronounced shi when read in present-day Standard Mandarin, with only the tones differing. 

The poem was written in the 1930s by the Chinese linguist Yuen Ren Chao as a linguistic demonstration. The poem is coherent and grammatical in Classical Chinese, but due to the number of Chinese homophones, it becomes difficult to understand in oral speech. In Mandarin, the poem is incomprehensible when read aloud, since only four syllables cover all the words of the poem. The poem is more comprehensible—but still not very intelligible—when read in other varieties of Chinese such as Cantonese, in which it has 22 different syllables, or Hokkien Chinese, in which it has 15 different syllables.

The poem is an example of a one-syllable article, a form of constrained writing possible in tonal languages such as Mandarin Chinese, where tonal contours expand the range of meaning for a single syllable.

Explanation
Mandarin is a tonal language in which changes in pitch change the meaning. In Romanized script, the poem is an example of Chinese antanaclasis. The poem shows the flexibility of the Chinese language in many ways, including wording, syntax, punctuation and sentence structures, which gives rise to various explanations. 

The poem can be interpreted as an objection to the Romanization of Chinese. The 20th-century author Yuen Ren Chao used this poem as an example to object to the use of vernacular Classical Chinese which is used less in conversational daily life—classical Chinese is more written than spoken.

The poem is easy to understand when read in its written form in Chinese characters, due to each character being associated with a different core meaning. It is also intelligible in its spoken form in Sinitic languages besides Mandarin. However, when in its Romanized form or spoken Mandarin form, it becomes confusing.

Evolution 

The loss of older sound combinations in Chinese over the centuries has greatly increased the number of Chinese homophones. Many words in the passage had distinct sounds in Middle Chinese, but over time, all of the variants of spoken Chinese have merged and split different sounds. For example, when the same passage is read in Cantonese (even modern Cantonese) there are seven distinct syllables—ci, sai, sap, sat, sek, si, sik—in six distinct tone contours, producing 22 distinct character pronunciations. In Southern Min, there are six distinct syllables—se, si, su, sek, sip, sit—in seven distinct tone contours, producing fifteen character pronunciations. Therefore, the passage is barely comprehensible when read aloud in modern Mandarin without context, but easier to understand when read in other Sinitic languages, such as Cantonese.

See also

Related puns
 Homophonic puns in Mandarin Chinese
 List of linguistic example sentences
 James while John had had had had had had had had had had had a better effect on the teacher
 Buffalo buffalo Buffalo buffalo buffalo buffalo Buffalo buffalo
 Neko no ko koneko, shishi no ko kojishi
 "The Chaos"

Chinese
 Languages of China
 List of varieties of Chinese
 A list of other Classical Chinese texts based entirely on modern homophones in Chinese Wikipedia

References

External links
 The Three "NOTs" of Hanyu Pinyin has a similar but different text
 
 How to Read a Chinese Poem with Only One Sound has a transcription of the passage in Traditional and Simplified Chinese, as well as a Pinyin transcription and a translation.

Romanization of Chinese
Chinese poems
Constrained writing
Chinese language
Language games
Homonymy
Homonymy in Chinese